Wheelock Place, (Tamil ) is a 21-floor office tower and shopping mall on Singapore's  Orchard Road.

Background
The building was designed by Kisho Kurokawa and completed in 1994 as Lane Crawford Place. It is now owned by Wharf Estates Singapore, formerly "Wheelock Properties (Singapore)", a division of Hong Kong's Wheelock and Co.

The mall has an underpass to Shaw House and ION Orchard. It was the site of Borders' flagship Singapore store until its closure in 2011. Following which, Marks & Spencer became Wheelock Place's main tenant.

A new book shop, Zall Bookstore, opened in 2021.

The mall houses multiple homegrown retail, food, and lifestyle brands. Among these are Browhaus, Cedele, and Privè.

See also
 List of shopping malls in Singapore

References

External links
 

Shopping malls in Singapore
Orchard Road
Wheelock and Company
Orchard, Singapore
1993 establishments in Singapore